James Alexander Lawrence (born 22 August 1992) is a professional footballer who currently plays for German club Nürnberg. Born in England, he represents the Wales national team.

Lawrence has previously played for St. Pauli, Anderlecht, AS Trenčín and youth teams at Arsenal, Queens Park Rangers, Sparta Rotterdam and Ajax.

Club career

Early career 
Lawrence's early youth career included London clubs Enfield, Arsenal and Queens Park Rangers. In 2008 his family moved to the Netherlands where he joined HFC Haarlem. In 2009 Lawrence left Haarlem to join Ajax with whom he won the Netherlands U19 First Division Championship in 2010–11 and was coached by Arsenal legend Dennis Bergkamp. Lawrence then had spells with Jong Sparta Rotterdam and Jong RKC Waalwijk whilst he was enrolled at the Johan Cruyff Institute in Amsterdam.

AS Trenčín 
Lawrence transferred to AS Trenčín on 13 August 2014 aged 21 and scored on his debut the same day in a Slovak Cup match against ŠK Strážske. Four days later, Lawrence made his Fortuna Liga debut in a 4–2 win against Košice. On 1 May 2015, Lawrence helped AS Trenčín to a maiden Slovak Cup, beating Senica in the final in Poprad. In May 2015 AS Trenčín became Fortuna Liga Champions for the first time with Lawrence thus achieving the league and cup double in his first senior season.

The AS Trenčín champions of 2014–15, with an average age of 21.74, were recognised as having been the youngest champions across 31 top division European leagues from 2009–2017 by the CIES Football Observatory.

Lawrence missed the end of the 2014–15 season and the beginning of the 2015–16 season due to an injury sustained in the 2015 Cup Final, returning on 13 October 2015 when he scored in a 3–0 win over Blava Jaslovské Bohunice in the 4th round of the Slovak Cup. A 3–1 win over Slovan Bratislava in the Slovak Cup Final on 29 April 2016 secured a second Slovak Cup for Lawrence and AS Trenčín. On 8 May 2016, AS Trenčín beat Slovan Bratislava 4–0 to become Fortuna Liga Champions for the second year in succession. Two seasons later, on 16 August 2018, Lawrence's role in the elimination of Feyenoord from the UEFA Europa League qualifying round brought him to the attention of Anderlecht who went on to negotiate his transfer from Trenčín just 13 days later.

Anderlecht 
On 29 August 2018, Lawrence joined Anderlecht, Belgium's most successful league club. Lawrence played 23 league matches for Anderlecht during the 2018–19 season with Anderlecht finishing in fourth place in the Jupiler Pro League and in sixth place in the play-offs.

FC St. Pauli 
On 22 August 2019, Lawrence joined 2. Bundesliga side St. Pauli on loan from Anderlecht until the end of the 2019–20 season. He made his debut for St. Pauli on 26 August 2019, scoring in a 2–1 win over Holstein Kiel.

On 1 October 2020, Lawrence made a permanent transfer from Anderlecht to St. Pauli. On 6 March 2021 Lawrence captained St. Pauli for the first time in a 0-0 draw away at Karlsruher SC and on 21 July 2021 he was named vice-captain of St. Pauli for the 2021–22 season. On 18 January 2022, Lawrence captained St. Pauli in a 2–1 win at home against cup holders Borussia Dortmund in the DFB-Pokal which put St. Pauli into the cup quarter-finals for the first time in 16 years. St. Pauli ended the 2021-22 season in fifth place in 2. Bundesliga.

1. FC Nürnberg 
On 22 July 2022, Lawrence joined 2. Bundesliga side 1. FC Nürnberg.

International career 
On 5 November 2018, Lawrence was called up for the Wales squad by Ryan Giggs and he started his first game for the national side in a friendly against Albania on 20 November 2018. His first competitive game for Wales was in a 1–0 win against Slovakia at Cardiff City Stadium on 24 March 2019. On 18 November 2020, Lawrence was in the starting line-up as Wales became UEFA Nations League, Group H, winners, beating Finland 3–1, ensuring a place in the Nations League top tier for 2022 and a fall-back play-off spot for 2022 FIFA World Cup qualification. Lawrence was named in the Wales squad for the UEFA Euro 2020 competition on 30 May 2021 but had to withdraw on the day of the announcement following injury in the previous day's training session. Lawrence's competitive matches for Wales included four wins; against Slovakia, Finland, Czech Republic and Belarus, and losses away to Croatia, Hungary and Belgium in a period in which Wales gained promotion in the Nations League and qualification for the 2022 World Cup.

Career statistics

Club

International

Honours 
AS Trenčín
 Slovak Super Liga: 2014–15, 2015–16
 Slovak Cup: 2014–15, 2015–16

References

External links 
Profile

1992 births
Living people
People from Henley-on-Thames
Welsh footballers
Welsh expatriate footballers
Wales international footballers
English people of Welsh descent
Association football defenders
Sparta Rotterdam players
AFC Ajax players
RKC Waalwijk players
AS Trenčín players
R.S.C. Anderlecht players
FC St. Pauli players
Eredivisie players
Slovak Super Liga players
Belgian Pro League players
2. Bundesliga players
Expatriate footballers in Slovakia
Welsh expatriate sportspeople in Slovakia
Expatriate footballers in Belgium
Welsh expatriate sportspeople in Belgium
Expatriate footballers in Germany
Welsh expatriate sportspeople in Germany